Amb or Kingdom of Amb, also known as Feudal Tanawal was a princely state in the present day Khyber Pakhtunkhwa region of Pakistan. The Tanoli submitted to British colonial rule in the 1840s. Following Pakistani independence in 1947, and for some months afterwards, the Nawabs of Amb remained unaffiliated. At the end of December 1947, the Nawab of Amb state acceded to Pakistan while retaining internal self-government. Amb continued as a princely state of Pakistan until 1969, when it was incorporated into the North West Frontier Province (now Khyber Pakhtunkhwa).

The state was named after the town of Amb. After the death of the last Nawab, Muhammad Farid Khan Tanoli, the fighting between the descendants of the state of Amb for power continued, which ended in 1971, when the Pakistani army ended or occupied the integration. In 1972, the recognition of their royal status was ended by the Government of Pakistan. In 1974, the Tarbela Dam completely destroyed the capital of Amb and the palaces of the Amb state.

List of Nawabs of Amb

Wealth and Military Status

Amb was considered a powerful and important state during Durrani, Mughal and British Raj. The total revenue of the state in 1901 was 36-42 lakhs when the price of 1 tola gold is 20 British Rupee. In 1901, state's income was 6 lakhs and second part of its revenue was the collection of tax from other state's Nawabs and Maharajahs, who used the routes of Tanawal and Attock for visiting other countries. This tax was also collected by Traders and Merchants who used that routes.
In this way, Nawab of Amb fought many wars with British, Durrani and Sikh this is the main cause of war.

History 

Amb state, once known as Mulk-e-Tanawal (country/area of Tanawal), was the home of the Tanoli. The region's early history dates back to the Mughal Empire, when around year 1647, the Tanoli tribe conquered and settled by the Indus River, surrounded by wide area, which came to be known as Tanawal. Before Tanawal, it was known as the Pakhli Sultanate (Karluks Turk), which ruled over Hazara, who came to Timur around 1380 to 1390. This was the only state of the Mughal Empire which did not pay tax to Delhi. The rule of the Karluks ended when the Swatis arrived. The last Karluks ruler was Sultan Mehmood Khurd,  accordingly the start of Tanoli's rule. The ancestry can be traced back to the Barlas Turks, who are the descendants of Timur. When the Durrani tribe arrived in India, the Tanoli chieftain Suba Khan Tanoli accepted Durrani rule in 1755 and helped the empire during the Third Battle of Panipat.

In 1854, the British frontier officer General James Abbott postulated that Aornos was located on the Mahaban range, south of modern Buner District. In 1839, he proposed to recognise Embolina, as had Ranjit Singh's mercenary General Claude Auguste Court, as the village of Amb situated on the right bank of the Indus eight miles east of Mahaban. This became the location from which it is thought that the Nawabs of Amb took their title in later years.

Descent and ruling dynasty 
The Tanoli describe themselves as Pashtuns from the Ghazni area, or as Barlas Turks. The Tanoli submitted to British colonial rule in the 1840s.

Nawab Khan Tanoli 
Mir Nawab Khan Tanoli was the ruler of The Tanawal valley and the Chief of the Hazara region from circa 1810 until he died in 1818. During his rule, he faced many attacks from the Sikh Empire and Durrani Empire, resulting in a significant loss of territory. He was 26 years old, when he was assassinated by Azim Khan on October 13, 1818 in the Stratagem of Peshawar.

The main reason for the war is that Mir Nawab Khan defied Durrani and the other main reason was that, when Azim Khan's mother was traveling to Kashmir via Tanwal, Nawab Khan's soldier collected the taxes from her. Azim Khan then traveled through Tanwal and then Nawab Khan's soldiers collected taxes through Azim Khan as well. After Azim Khan took the complaint to the Afghan court, the Afghan Ruler of that time immediately sent his army.

Nawab Khan Tanoli's sons, Painda Khan and Maddad Khan began the series of rebellion against the Sikhs and Durrani, which continued throughout his lifetime.

Painda Khan Tanoli 
From about 1813, Painda Khan Tanoli is famed for his staunch rebellion against Maharaja Ranjit Singh's governors of Hazara. He was the son of Mir Nawab Khan Tanoli.

From about 1813, Painda Khan Tanoli engaged in a lifelong rebellion against the Sikhs, who, realizing the potential dangers of his rebellion, set up forts at strategic locations to keep him in check. Hari Singh Nalwa took this initiative during his governorship. To consolidate his hold on Tanawal and to unite the Tanoli people, Tanoli first had to contend with his major rivals within the tribe itself, that is, the chiefs of the Suba Khani/Pallal Khel section, whom he subdued after a bitter struggle.

Tanoli set the tone for regional resistance in Upper Hazara against Sikh rule. In 1828, he created and gifted the smaller neighbouring state of Phulra to his younger brother Maddad Khan Tanoli.

Painda Khan briefly took over the valley of Agror in 1834. Agror was restored to Ata Muhammad Khan, the chief of that area, a descendant of Akhund Ahmed Sad-ud-din.

Jehandad Khan Tanoli 
He was the son of Mir Painda Khan Tanoli. In 1852, Jehandad Khan Tanoli was summoned by the President of the Board of Administration about a murder enquiry of two British officers, supposedly on his lands. In fact, this was related to the murder of two British salt tax collectors by some tribesmen in the neighbouring Kala Dhaka or Black Mountain area, which eventually led to the punitive First Black Mountain campaign/expedition of 1852. The Board of Administration President was Sir John Lawrence (later the Lieutenant-Governor of the Punjab), and he visited Haripur, in Hazara, where he invited many Hazara chiefs to see him on various matters, at a general Durbar. Jehandad Khan Tanoli succeeded in establishing his innocence and consolidated his position.

Jahandad Khan Tanoli's relationship with British India is summed in the following lines in a letter dated 8 January 1859 from R. Temple, Secretary to the Punjab Chief Commissioner, addressed to the Punjab Financial Commissioner: "'5. The term "Jagir" has never appeared to me applicable in any sense to this [Jehandad Khan's] hereditary domain [Upper Tannowul], for it was never granted as such by the Sikhs or by our Government; we upheld the Khan as we found him in his position as a feudal lord and large proprietor.'

Jehandad's son, Nawab Bahadur Sir Muhammed Akram Khan Tanoli, was given the title of Nawab (Sovereign Ruler) in perpetuity by the British.

Muhammad Akram Khan Tanoli 
The next chief of the Tanoli, a son of Jahandad Khan Tanoli, was Akram Khan Tanoli KCSI 68–1907). He was a popular chief. During his tenure, the fort at Shergarh was built along with forts in Dogah and Shahkot. His rule was a peaceful time for Tanawal. He opposed construction of schools in the state, on advice given by British.

Muhammad Khan Zaman Khan Tanoli 
Khan Zaman Khan Tanoli succeeded his father, taking over the reins of power in Tanawal in Amb. He helped the British in carrying out the later Black Mountain (Kala Dhaka/Tor Ghar) expeditions.

Muhammad Farid Khan Tanoli 
Muhammad Farid Khan Tanoli had good relations with Muhammad Ali Jinnah and Liaqat Ali Khan. His contributions to the Pakistan movement have been acknowledged by letters from Jinnah. In 1947, he acceded his state to Pakistan by signing the Instrument of Accession in favour of Pakistan. In 1969, the state was incorporated into the North West Frontier Province (now Khyber-Pakhtunkhwa) and in 1972, the Government of Pakistan ceased to recognise the royal status of the Nawab.

Muhammad Saeed Khan Tanoli 
Muhammad Saeed Khan Tanoli, son of Muhammad Farid Khan Tanoli, the last nawab of Amb, studied at the Burn Hall School in Abbottabad (now the Army Burn Hall College) and the Gordon College in Rawalpindi. Nawab Saeed Khan Tanoli ruled for a period of three years.

Salahuddin Saeed Khan Tanoli 
Salahuddin Saeed Khan Tanoli is the present chief of Tanolis and the titular Nawab of Amb. He is the son of Nawab Muhammad Saeed Khan Tanoli. He holds the record as the youngest parliamentarian ever elected to the Pakistan National Assembly, and then went on to be elected five times to the Pakistan National Assembly (from 1985 to 1997), a feat achieved by only seven other Pakistani parliamentarians, including the former Pakistani prime minister, Nawaz Sharif.

Amb State Postal Service and Passport
Existing alongside British India were hundreds of princely states, some 565 in all, but most of them did not issue postage stamps. Only around forty of the states issued their own postage stamps, and Amb State was one of them, having its own postal service. The rest used the stamps of the All India Postal Service.

Present geography
The state consists of the following present day Union Councils of Mansehra, Torghar, and Haripur Districts:

The Mansehra and Torghar districts include Bandi Shungli, Shergarh, Karorri, Nika Pani, Darband, Dara Shanaya, Swan Miara, Lassan Nawab, Perhinna, Phulrra, Jhokan, and Palsala. The Haripur district includes Baitgali, Nara AmaNara Amazz, Kalinjar, and Beer.

Also read 
 Politics of Pakistan
 British raj
 History of Pakistan
 List of Indian princely states
 Shergarh, Tanawal

References

External links 

 Government of Khyber-Pakhtunkhwa
 Genealogy of the ruling chiefs of Amb

History of Khyber Pakhtunkhwa
Princely states of Pakistan
1507 establishments in India
1969 disestablishments in Pakistan
Princely states of India
Muslim princely states of India
States and territories established in the 19th century
States and territories disestablished in 1969